"Joy" is a song by American R&B group Blackstreet. The song was written by Michael Jackson,  Teddy Riley, and Tammy Lucas it was released as the fifth single for the group's self-titled debut album Blackstreet (1994).

The song peaked at number forty-three on the Billboard Hot 100 chart.

Track listing
 12", CD, Vinyl
"Joy" (LP Version - No Rap) - 4:54
"Joy" (Uptown Joy) - 4:13
"Joy" (Cool Joy) - 5:02
"Joy" (New Carnegie Mix) - 4:03
"Joy" (Latin Combo) - 5:10
"Joy" (Quiet Storm) - 4:33

Charts

Weekly charts

Year-end charts

Personnel
Information taken from Discogs.
engineering – Şerban Ghenea, George Mayers
mixing – Teddy Riley
producer – Teddy Riley
remixing – Teddy Riley
saxophone – Mike Phillips
string arrangement - Jeremy Lubbock

Notes

1995 singles
Blackstreet songs
Song recordings produced by Teddy Riley
Songs written by Teddy Riley
Songs written by Michael Jackson
1994 songs
Interscope Records singles
Contemporary R&B ballads
1990s ballads